Abd-ol-Ghaffar Amilakhori (died ) was an early 17th-century noble from the Georgian Amilakhori family of Kartli, prominent in the Safavid Iranian service.

Biography
Abd-ol-Ghaffar Amilakhori was raised at the Safavid court in Isfahan and was a "typical member of the new Georgian converted elite". Abd-ol-Ghaffar was a son of Faramarz Amilakhori by his wife Tamar, a great-grandson of King Luarsab I of Kartli. His sister Tamar was a favourite concubine of the Safavid shah Abbas I (r. 1588–1629). 

When in 1624, Abbas I married off his granddaughter to the ruler of Kartli, Semayun Khan (Simon II), Abd-ol-Ghaffar's wife was a companion to the bride.  Amilakhori and another leading Georgian noble, Zurab, eristavi of Aragvi, entertained the guests of the wedding party on the orders of the Safavid-Georgian officer Murav Beg (Giorgi Saakadze). Around the same time, the Shah arranged the marriage of Abd-ol-Ghaffar Amilakhori to a daughter of Imam-Quli Khan, a prominent Safavid military and political leader of Georgian descent. According to the contemporary Safavid historian Fazli Khuzani, Amilakhori was 22-years old at the time of his marriage. 

While in Kartli, Amilakhori was known as a champion of the Safavid interests in the country. He further expanded his estates at the expense of  the neighbouring noble families, exterminated the Ghazneli and had the area around Mtskheta ravaged. In 1625/26, Amilakhori and his wife were captured by the rebellious Georgians and imprisoned in the fortress of Arshi. After the rebels' defeat at the battle of Marabda, Abbas I sent a force to rescue them. According to Fazli Khuzani, upon being informed of this, the rebels sent the Amilakhori and his wife to Amilakhori's relatives, as well as those of Allahverdi Khan (the father of Imam-Quli Khan). Amilakhori, thereafter, disappears from historical records.

Notes

References

Sources
 
 
 

1620s deaths
People from Isfahan
Iranian people of Georgian descent
Shia Muslims from Georgia (country)
Converts to Shia Islam from Eastern Orthodoxy
Former Georgian Orthodox Christians
Nobility of Georgia (country)
17th-century people of Safavid Iran
17th-century people from Georgia (country)